Nikola Vujović (Cyrillic: Никола Вујовић; born 23 June 1981) is a Montenegrin retired footballer who plays as an attacking midfielder.

Club career
Vujović spent the majority of his club career at Budućnost Podgorica and Mogren, having two spells with each side. He also played for Greek club Akratitos. In the 2009 winter transfer window, Vujović was transferred to Serbian champions Partizan. He helped the side defend the double in the 2008–09 season. However, after the initial six months at the club, Vujović was receiving very little playing time before being demoted from the first team. He ultimately returned to Mogren two years after leaving the club.

International career
At international level, Vujović earned six caps for Montenegro between 2007 and 2009, making his debut against Japan at the Kirin Cup. His final international was an April 2009 FIFA World Cup qualification match against Georgia.

Statistics

Club

International

Honours
Budućnost Podgorica
 Second League of Serbia and Montenegro: 2003–04
Partizan
 Serbian SuperLiga: 2008–09
 Serbian Cup: 2008–09
Kom
 Montenegrin Second League: 2016–17

References

External links
 
 

1981 births
Living people
Sportspeople from Cetinje
Association football midfielders
Serbia and Montenegro footballers
Montenegrin footballers
Montenegro international footballers
FK Budućnost Podgorica players
A.P.O. Akratitos Ano Liosia players
FK Mogren players
FK Partizan players
FK Čelik Nikšić players
FK Lovćen players
FK Cetinje players
FK Kom players
FK Mornar players
Expatriate footballers in Greece
Expatriate footballers in Serbia
Second League of Serbia and Montenegro players
First League of Serbia and Montenegro players
Super League Greece players
Montenegrin First League players
Serbian SuperLiga players
Montenegrin Second League players
Serbia and Montenegro expatriate footballers
Serbia and Montenegro expatriate sportspeople in Greece
Montenegrin expatriate footballers
Montenegrin expatriate sportspeople in Serbia